The Midtown Interchange, located in the Civic Center and Overtown neighborhoods of Miami, Florida, is the convergence of three major motorways: I-95, I-395 (which connects to the MacArthur Causeway to the east), and the Dolphin Expressway (SR 836).

Since its opening in 1968, eight lanes have been added to I-95 and an undersea tunnel below Biscayne Bay has been added from the end of I-395 near Museum Park. The tunnel serves as a direct freeway connection to the PortMiami, expected to alleviate freight traffic in Downtown Miami. It was originally the largest stack interchange in Miami until 2016, when it was surpassed by the Dolphin–Palmetto Interchange.

As of 2019, most of the interchange is being rebuilt as part of the Signature Bridge project for I-395 that also includes double decking the eastern end of the Dolphin Expressway.

References

Interstate 95
Road interchanges in the United States
Roads in Miami
1968 establishments in Florida